M6 Music is a French music video television channel owned and operated by the M6 Group.

External links
Official Website

Music television channels
Television stations in France
French-language television stations
Television channels and stations established in 1998
1998 establishments in France
Music organizations based in France